English Today is an academic journal on the English language, established in 1985 by Tom McArthur (who edited it until 2008) and published quarterly by Cambridge University Press. Its scope covers all aspects of current English and its varieties used around the world. The current editor-in-chief is Emeritus Professor Clive Upton (University of Leeds).

Abstracting and indexing 
The journal is abstracted and indexed in the MLA Bibliography.

References

External links 
 

Linguistics journals
Cambridge University Press academic journals
Quarterly journals
English-language journals
Publications established in 1985